The Kirksville Daily Express is a bi-weekly newspaper published Wednesday and Saturday. It serves the Kirksville and Adair County, Missouri area including the communities of Brashear and Novinger. It is owned by Phillips Media Group.

History
While newspapers in Adair County date back as early as 1856, the Kirksville Daily Express had its beginnings in 1901 when the Kirksville Evening Express was started by N. A. Matlick and J. Orton Rice. In 1906, under the new ownership of C. C. Howard, the name was changed to the Kirksville Daily Express. In November, 1909 Howard sold it to a trio of businessmen led by E. E. Swain. Swain soon bought out his two partners and the newspaper would remain in the Swain family for the next eight decades. Edward Everett Swain, a native of Ewing, Illinois had  considerable newspaper experience before coming to Kirksville. He previously worked for major publications in Rochester, New York as well as the St. Louis Post-Dispatch, St. Louis Globe-Democrat and the Associated Press.

Early notable events in the newspapers' history include joining the United Press Association in 1915 and the coming of news via teletypewriter in 1928. After working out of a number of rented building spaces for the first several years, in 1930 E. E. Swain constructed an art deco style building in downtown Kirksville. It, along with an addition constructed in 1964 to house an offset printer, continues to serve as the Express offices. Following Swain's death in 1972 ownership and operation of the newspaper passed to his son E. E. Swain, Jr.

In 1990 the Daily Express was sold to American Publishing Company, although a Swain, E. E.'s grandson Tony, still remained as pressroom supervisor. Gatehouse Media (formerly Liberty Media Group) assumed operation of the newspaper in 1998. Faced with an aging offset press needing upgrade and growing consolidation in the newspaper industry, the decision was made in December, 2010 to shift printing of the Kirksville Daily Express to a sister Gatehouse Media operation in Hannibal, Missouri. Other than printing however all operations remain in Kirksville.

References

 A Book of Adair County History. Pg. 171-173 Published by the Adair County Bicentennial Committee, 1976. 
 Hunsicker, Jason The end of an Era: Shifting press operations to Hannibal closes century of Kirksville printing. Published by Kirksville Daily Express. 13 December 2010.

External links 
 
 GateHouse Media

Newspapers published in Missouri
Adair County, Missouri
Kirksville micropolitan area, Missouri
Gannett publications